Antoine Caill (7 February 1923 – 26 April 1976) was a French politician.

Caill was born on 7 February 1923. He was first elected mayor of Plouzévédé in 1959. From 1962, Caill was a member of the National Assembly, representing Finistère. He died on 26 April 1976 of a stroke. Caill was succeeded as mayor by his wife Marguerite, who served until 2001, and was subsequently named honorary mayor. Yves Michel replaced Antoine Caill as a deputy.

References

1923 births
1976 deaths
Mayors of places in Brittany
Deputies of the 2nd National Assembly of the French Fifth Republic
Deputies of the 3rd National Assembly of the French Fifth Republic
Deputies of the 4th National Assembly of the French Fifth Republic
Deputies of the 5th National Assembly of the French Fifth Republic
Union for the New Republic politicians
Rally for the Republic politicians
People from Finistère